is a small Solar System body (extended centaur) from the scattered disk or inner Oort cloud.  has the 8th-largest semi-major axis of a minor planet not detected outgassing like a comet (and  have a larger semi-major axis).

 came to perihelion in November 2014 at a distance of 7.9 AU from the Sun (inside of the orbit of Saturn). With an absolute magnitude (H) of 10.2,  has an estimated diameter of 40 km. Comet Hale–Bopp, which is roughly the same size, was not discovered until it was 7.2 AU from the Sun and had started outgassing CO.  may be discovered to be cometary as it comes to perihelion. It comes to opposition at the start of April.

After leaving the planetary region of the Solar System,  will have a barycentric aphelion of 827 AU with an orbital period of 8500 years. In a 10 million year integration of the orbit, one of the 3-sigma clones is ejected from the Solar System.

Physical characteristics and orbit
A 2016 study found  to have a comet-like albedo of 2.9% (darker than any other known ejected centaur) and a color typical of D-type asteroids. It is unknown if it is a so-called "super comet" or an extinct comet, considering its large distance from the Sun. It was also determined that  has a diameter of  kilometers, larger than initially believed. A light curve analysis found it to have a rotation period of  hours, typical of asteroids its size. No significant satellites were detected.

It was also found that  is on an extremely unstable orbit, with a ~64% chance of being ejected from the Solar system in 1 million years, and a ~25% chance of being ejected in the next 500,000 years, as well as a 4.2% chance of its orbit venturing into the neighborhood of Earth.

Comparison

See also
90377 Sedna (relatively large and also distant body)
List of hyperbolic comets
Pluto
2012 VP113
List of Solar System objects by greatest aphelion
Have very large aphelion
 (14–2049 AU)
 (4–2049 AU)
 (8–1920 AU)

References

External links 
 2013 AZ60  (Seiichi Yoshida)
 JPL Webcite archive of Epoch 2016-Jan-13 with aphelion (Q) of 1450AU
 

Trans-Neptunian objects
Inner Oort cloud
Minor planet object articles (unnumbered)
20130110